Orsa Maggiore is an ocean ketch, serving as a sail training vessel for the Italian Navy. It is an oceanic yacht racing armed as ketch of the Italian Navy's sail section.

History
Designed by Andrea Vallicelli, it was built using composite of carbon sandwich, kevlar and fiberglass, which made the structure of the hull lighter and simultaneously much more resistant than older wooden hulls. The design was considered innovative for its time.

The ship has been commissioned directly by the Italian Navy in order to have a hull that would give preference all the features to ensure maximum safety at sea in all the seas and oceans of the planet, with all conditions of sea and wind, and therefore capable to carry the National flag to wave even in the most remote ports in the world, particularly the less beaten by ships more of the Italian Navy.

References

External links
Orsa Maggiore (A 5323) Marina Militare website

Sail training
Training ships of the Italian Navy
Ships built in Venice
1994 ships